The Law for the Restoration of the Professional Civil Service (shortened to Berufsbeamtengesetz), also known as Civil Service Law, Civil Service Restoration Act, and Law to Re-establish the Civil Service, was a law passed by the Nazi regime of Germany on 7 April 1933, two months after Adolf Hitler had attained power and two weeks after the promulgation of the Enabling Act. It was one of the first anti-Semitic and racist laws to be passed in Germany.

Articles of the law
Article 1 of the Law claimed that in order to re-establish a "national" and "professional" civil service, members of certain groups of tenured civil servants were to be dismissed. Civil servants who were not of Aryan descent were to retire. Non-Aryans were defined as someone descended from non-Aryans, especially those descended from Jewish parents, or grandparents. Members of the Communist Party, or any related or associated organisation were to be dismissed. This meant that Jews, other non Aryans, and political opponents could not serve as teachers, professors, judges, or other government positions. Shortly afterwards, a similar law was passed concerning lawyers, doctors, tax consultants, musicians, and notaries.

As the law was first drafted by the Interior Minister Wilhelm Frick, all those of "non-Aryan descent" were to be fired immediately at the Reich, Länder and municipal levels of government. However, the President of Germany, Paul von Hindenburg objected to the bill until it had been amended to exclude three classes of civil servants from the ban:
World War I veterans who had served at the front
those who had been in the civil service continuously since 1 August 1914 (i.e. since the start of the War)
those who lost a father or son in combat in the Great War

Hitler agreed to these amendments and the bill was signed into law on 7 April 1933. In practice, the amendments excluded most Jewish civil servants and not until after Hindenburg's death in 1934, were they disallowed. Nonetheless, passage of the law was a crucial turning point in the history of German Jewry, for it marked the first time since the last German Jews had been emancipated in 1871 that an anti-Semitic law had been passed in Germany. In one particularly notable example of the law's effect, Albert Einstein resigned his position at the Prussian Academy of Sciences and emigrated to the United States before he could be expelled.

Article 4 of the Law ("Civil servants who, after their previous political activities, cannot guarantee that they will always stand up for the national state without reservation[…].") had the intention to remove all personnel that, because of their political views, could not be relied upon by the Party to execute its wishes (Gleichschaltung).  This Article 4 affected all Germans irrespective of their "racial" origins.

Content
Following the decree, Albert Gorter redefined the term 'Aryan' in the Aryan paragraph as:

However, this definition was unacceptable because it included non-European races. Achim Gercke later redefined this unacceptable definition as the one already used by the Expert Advisor for Population and Racial Policy which stated "An Aryan is one who is tribally related to German blood. An Aryan is the descendant of a Volk domiciled in Europe in a closed tribal settlement since recorded history." This new definition allowed the Civil Service Law to differentiate between 'Aryans' and 'non-Aryans'. However, the quantity of how much Jewish blood an individual was allowed to have until it was considered to damage the German Volk remained untenable.

(The following is translated from the German version of this page.)
Political opponents of national socialism ("Officials who, on account of their past political activities cannot guarantee that they have always acted wholeheartedly for the national state") should either be forced into retirement or let go from their jobs.

Moreover, civil servants should be let go if they had started their jobs after 1918 and were now unable to demonstrate that they had acquired all the training necessary for their careers. These people were called "membership book officials (Parteibuch-Beamte)" in the language of National Socialist propaganda.

According to § 3 (1) of the "First Ordinance for the accomplishment of the Law for the Restoration of the Professional Civil Service, the first definition of a Jew was defined as:

They could be let go or prematurely forced into retirement. According to § 3 (2), however, "non-Aryan" officials should be left in their positions if they had occupied those positions since a date before August 1914. Those Jewish civil servants who had a son or father who had been killed in the First World War were also spared from being sacked. This loophole also applied to "Frontkämpfer" (Front-line soldiers) (see Frontkämpferprivileg). All persons in the civil service would have to be able to produce the Ariernachweis (proof of Aryan ancestry) in order to prove that they had no ancestors of the Jewish faith. The loophole was closed by the 1935 Nuremberg Laws. Jewish civil servants still holding their posts were given notice by 31 December 1935 at the latest.

According to § 6 of the law, civil servants could be forced into retirement without cause "for the simplification of administration". The vacant positions created by this action were not to be refilled.

In rapid succession numerous regulations were dispensed with, as well as many employees and labourers in civil service as well as in the Reichsbank.

Pensions were not allowed for all groups of people forced into the ranks of pensioners by this law. The guaranteed old-age pension was reduced in 1938 by the "Siebente Verordnung zum Reichsbürgergesetz".

On 1 September 1933, Frick issued the second supplementary decree of the law in attempt to define the terms “Aryan” and “non-Aryan”:

Related ordinances
11 April 1933 – First Ordinance on the Implementation of the Law for the Restoration of the Professional Civil Service
25 April 1933 – Law against the Overcrowding of German Schools and Universities
6 May 1933 – Third Ordinance on the Implementation of the Law for the Restoration of the Professional Civil Service
21 January 1935 – Law on the Retirement and Transfer of Professors as a Result of the Reorganization of the German System of Higher Education

See also
Aryan certificate Ahnentafel, Ahnenpass to prove Aryan descent
Racial policy of Nazi Germany

Notes

References

Bauer, Yehuda: A History Of The Holocaust. New York: F. Watts, 1982. ,  0-531-09862-1. 
Friedländer, Saul: Nazi Germany and the Jews Volume 1. The Years of Persecution, 1933-1939. New York: HarperCollins, 1997 .
Hentschel, Klaus, editor and Ann M. Hentschel, editorial assistant and translator: Physics and National Socialism: An Anthology of Primary Sources. Birkhäuser: Basel, Berlin, Boston, 1996. .

External links
Robertson, Struan. "The Jewish Community in Hamburg 1860-1943". Retrieved September 25, 2005.
Law for the Restoration of the Professional Civil Service, April 7, 1933 in English
German original of the text
Berufsbeamtengesetz from German-language Wikipedia. Retrieved September 25, 2005.

1933 in Germany
1933 in law
Civil services
The Holocaust in Germany
Holocaust racial laws
Political and cultural purges
Law in Nazi Germany
Jewish German history
Repealed German legislation
April 1933 events